Saint Sebastian is a Roman Catholic church in Middletown, Connecticut, part of the  Diocese of Norwich.

History
In the early 20th Century, immigrants from the Sicilian town of Melilli moved in large numbers to Middletown. By 1920 there were enough families there to form a vibrant and close-knit  Italian community that desired its own place of worship. Through a massive fundraising effort, the donation of materials, and the labor of masons, plasterers and stone carvers, the Italian community realized the dream of its own church, a significant local cultural symbol and the only Italian national parish in the Diocese of Norwich.

Building

The imposing 1931 Italian influenced Renaissance Revival church building was designed by architect Raymond C. Gorrani of Worcester, Massachusetts. Gorrani had designed the very similar Church of Our Lady of Mt. Carmel in Worcester a few years earlier and, according to a recent history of St. Sebastian, members of the parish actually traveled to Worcester to inspect Mt. Carmel Church before employing Gorrani. In keeping with the desire of his clients, Gorrani's finished design is heavily influenced by the design of the Basilica of St. Sebastian in Melilli.

In December 1931, shortly after construction on the church had begun, Fr. Rocco Guerriero was appointed the first resident pastor of St. Sebastian Church. Very shortly thereafter Fr. Guerriero appointed his brother, Daniel A. Guerriero as the supervising architect to oversee the completion of Gorrani's design. Little is known about Raymond Gorrani but it is known that after St. Sebastian, which was built while the architect was also designing a church for St. Ann Parish in Marlboro, Massachusetts, he had no additional commissions.

The building is listed as a significant contributing property of the City of Middletown Historic District.

Music
The Church's Organ is an Austin Organs, Inc. Opus 1828 that has 2 manuals and 15 ranks. The Church also has an Adult Choir and Children's Choir.

St. Sebastian Feast
The beloved Feast of St. Sebastian was first celebrated in Middletown in the early 20th century. Proceeds from the feast's early years helped finance the building of the church. Held annually, the three-day festival features a parade through Middletown's streets, carrying the statue of the patron saint.

Yoked Parish 
The Parishes of St. Sebastian and St. John share a Priest since 2017, so Daily Mass and Sunday Masses are held at both Parishes. The Parishes are still their own entities and are not merged as a combined parish.

Priests that served St. Sebastian Parish
Rev. Rocco Joseph Guerriero (1931-1936)
Rev. John James Keane (1936-1952)
Rev. Richard David Curtin (1952- 1962)
Rev. Paul J. Rivard (1962-1965)
Rev. Maurice F. Sullivan (1965-1969)
Rev. Zenon Algrid Smilga (1969-1980)
Rev. Salvatore Bentivegna (1980-1990)
Rev. Joseph Sibliano, O.S.J. (1990-1998)
Rev. Daniel Schwebs, O.S.J. (1998-2001)
Rev. Thomas J. Smith (2001-2004)
Rev. Augustine Naduvilekoot (2004-2007)
Rev. James Thaikoottathil, J.C.D.  (2007–Present)

References

External links 

 Official site
 Diocese of Norwich

1931 establishments in Connecticut
Roman Catholic churches completed in 1931
Renaissance Revival architecture in Connecticut
Churches in Middletown, Connecticut
Historic district contributing properties in Connecticut
National Register of Historic Places in Middlesex County, Connecticut
Churches on the National Register of Historic Places in Connecticut
Saint Sebastian